Echinopsis subdenudata (commonly called domino cactus, night blooming hedgehog, Easter lily cactus) is a species of cactus.  It has a globular shape, few spines, with large, white flowers attached to long, green tubes.  It occurs in Bolivia, at altitudes of 600–1800 metres. Under its synonym Echinopsis ancistrophora it has gained the Royal Horticultural Society's Award of Garden Merit.

Gallery

See also
 Night-blooming cereus
 Hedgehog cactus

Literature
 Cact. Succ. J. (Los Angeles) 28: 71 1956.
 Anales Mus. Nac. Buenos Aires ser. 3, 4: 492. 1905

References

subdenudata